The following is a list of episodes of the South Korean talk show Happy Together (해피투게더), broadcast on KBS2 every Thursday at 23:05 KST starting November 8, 2001. The show began airing in HD on March 17, 2011. Episodes are aired with English subtitles not only in episode reruns, but also episodes uploaded on KBS's official YouTube channel.

There were 179 episodes aired during Season 1, which ended on April 28, 2005. Season 2 was first released the pilot on February 14, 2005, then began officially airing on May 5, 2005, ended on June 21, 2007, and had 112 episodes. There were also 4 special episodes which aired between Season 1 and Season 2 on the traditional Korean holidays such as Chuseok, Seollal, or others festivals such as Thanksgiving and Christmas. Season 3 aired from July 5, 2007 to October 4, 2018, with 557 episodes. Season 4 aired from October 11, 2018 to April 2, 2020, with 77 episodes.

Happy Together (2001–2005)

2001

2002

{| class="wikitable" style="font-size:90%; text-align:center; width:90%"
! width="1%"|Episode # !! width="10%"|Date aired !! width="10%"|Person corner !! width="20%"|Guests !! width="10%"|Person corner !! width="20%"|Guests !! width="20%"|Notes
|-
! 9
| January 3, 2002 || WtS: The Land of Hope  (희망의 나라로) || Kim Jong-kook,  (NRG), Lee Ki-chan || rowspan=23|Happy "Nip and Tuck" Battle || Kim Han-saem,  ||
|-
! 10
| January 10, 2002 || WtS: Song of the Ranch (목장의 노래) || Hong Kyung-min, Jang Na-ra,  || rowspan=2|Click-B (Yoo Ho-seok) ||
|-
! 11
| January 17, 2002 || WtS: Old Black Joe (올드 블랙 죠) || Lee Hye-young, Kim Min-jung ||
|-
! 12
| January 24, 2002 || WtS: ’O sole mio (오! 나의 태양) || Kim Jang-hoon, Chae Jung-an,  (Goofy) ||  (Click-B),  ||
|-
! 13
| January 31, 2002 || WtS: My Old Kentucky Home (켄터키 옛집) || g.o.d (Kim Tae-woo, Danny Ahn, Joon Park, Son Hoyoung, Yoon Kye-sang) || Dana, Rottyful Sky ||
Special host: Kim Tae-woo
Last episode of Yoo Seung-jun as host
|-
! 14
| February 7, 2002 || WtS: Mournful Rain (구슬비) || Kang Ho-dong, Lee Soo-young, Seo Ji-young (S#arp) || rowspan=5|,  ||
Special host: Cha Tae-hyun
|-
! 15
| February 14, 2002 || WtS: Swanee River (스와니 강) || Kang Byung-kyu, Gu Bon-seung, Kim Jong-kook ||
|-
! 16
| February 21, 2002 || WtS: Baby Goats (아기염소) || Uhm Jung-hwa, Kim Jong-kook, Lee Ji-hye (S#arp) ||
|-
! 17
| February 28, 2002 || WtS: Stars (별) || Bae Ki-sung (CAN), Yoon Jung-soo, Hong Jin-kyung ||
Special host: Kim Jang-hoon
|-
! 18
|-
! 19
| March 14, 2002 || WtS: The Memories About Maggie (매기의 추억) || Kim Jong-kook, Song Eun-i, Chae Jung-an || rowspan=2|, Iconiq (Sugar) ||
|-
! 20
| March 21, 2002 || WtS: Go Fishing (고기 잡이) || Fin.K.L (Lee Hyori, Ock Joo-hyun, Sung Yu-ri, Lee Jin) ||
|-
! 21
| March 28, 2002 || WtS: Magnolia Flowers (목련화) || , Lee Soo-young,  (Click-B) || rowspan=5|, Iconiq (Sugar) ||
Special host: Choi Soo-jong
|-
! 22
| April 4, 2002 || WtS: Flowers Ballad (꽃타령) || Lee Kye-in, Hwangbo (Chakra),  ||
|-
! 23
| April 11, 2002 || WtS: Longing My Sweetheart (동무생각) || Kim Jung-min, Kim Jong-kook, Shin Ji (Koyote) ||
Lee Hyori joined as host beside Shin Dong-yup
Special host: Choi Soo-jong
|-
! 24
| April 18, 2002 || WtS: Black Cat Nero (검은 고양이 네로) || Lee Mi-sook, Kim Won-hee,  ||
The guests at left promoted for 
|-
! 25
| April 25, 2002 || WtS: Cold Noodles (냉면) || Country Kko Kko (Tak Jae-hoon, Shin Jung-hwan), Kim Jae-duc (J-Walk) ||
|-
! 26
| May 2, 2002 || WtS: The Green Sea (초록 바다) || Heo Joon-ho, Lee Chang-hoon, Lee Won-jong || Travis,  ||
The guests at left co-starred in Four Toes
|-
! 27
| May 9, 2002 || WtS: Miryang Arirang (밀양 아리랑) || Park Kyung-lim, Lee Ki-chan,  || rowspan=2|Travis, Iconiq (Sugar) ||
|-
! 28
| May 16, 2002 || WtS: Traveler (여행자) || Im Chang-jung, Jung Tae-woo,  ||
|-
! 29
| May 23, 2002 || WtS: Golden Country (금강산) || Jung Joon-ho, Han Eun-jung, Jung Yoon-don || rowspan=2|Silryuk, Iconiq (Sugar) ||
|-
! 30
| May 30, 2002 || WtS: Santa Lucia (산타루치아) || Im Chang-jung, Lee Hye-young, Yang Dong-geun ||
The guests at left promoted for 
|-
! 31
| June 6, 2002 || WtS: Win! A Virile Son of Korea (이기자 대한건아) || , Park Gwang-hyun, Park Ye-jin || Silryuk, Ash ||
The guests at left promoted for 
|-
! 32
| June 13, 2002 || colspan=4|Way to Schools Best 3 picked by viewers and netizens || 
|-
! 33
| June 20, 2002 || WtS: Growing Up (모두모두 자란다) || Kim Hyun-chul, Kang Byung-kyu, Eun Ji-won || Happy "Nip and Tuck" Battle || , Silryuk, Iconiq (Sugar),  || 
|-
! 34
| June 27, 2002 || Cheering World Cup || Chakra (Jung Ryeo-won), Iconiq (Sugar) || WtS: Battle Hymn of the Republic (조국찬가) || Hwangbo, Byun Jung-soo,  (Click-B) || 
|-
! 35
| July 4, 2002 || WtS: The Front Village (앞마을 순이) || Country Kko Kko (Tak Jae-hoon, Shin Jung-hwan), Lee Yoo-jin || rowspan=10|Happy "Nip and Tuck" Battle || rowspan=3|Iconiq (Sugar), J || 
|-
! 36
| July 11, 2002 || WtS: We Are Sprouts (새싹들이다) || Kang Susie, Yoo Chae-yeong,  (NRG) ||
|-
! 37
| July 18, 2002 || WtS: Robot Taekwon V (로보트 태권브이) || Choi Soo-jong, Kim Yoo-mi, Ha Ji-won ||
Two first guests at left co-starred in 
|-
! 38
| July 25, 2002 || WtS: The Icicles (고드름) || Kang Ho-dong, Kang Yoo-kyung || Jerome, Silryuk || 
|-
! 39
| August 1, 2002 || WtS: The Land of Hometown (고향땅) || , Lee Hyuk-jae, Rain || rowspan=3|As One (Lee Min, Crystal) || 
|-
! 40
| August 8, 2002 || WtS: Winter Night (겨울밤) || , Sung Si-kyung, Iconiq (Sugar) ||
Summer Special
|-
! 41
| August 15, 2002 || WtS: Boatman's Song (사공의 노래) || CAN (Bae Ki-sung), Kim Hyun-jung ||
|-
! 42
| August 22, 2002 || WtS: Maem Maem (맴맴) || Cha Tae-hyun, Son Ye-jin, Lee Eun-ju || Kim Isak (Isak N Jiyeon), Brian Joo (Fly to the Sky) ||
The guests at left promoted for Lovers' Concerto
|-
! 43
| August 29, 2002 || WtS: Pine Tree (소나무) || Cool (Yuri, Lee Jae-hoon) || As One (Lee Min, Crystal) || 
|-
! 44
| September 5, 2002 || WtS: Greener Pastures (푸른 목장) || Kim Bo-sung,  || Jerome, Silryuk, As One (Lee Min, Crystal) ||
The guests at left promoted for 
|-
! 45
| September 12, 2002 || WtS: Evening Primrose (달맞이) || colspan=3|Jo Young-nam, Yang Hee-eun,  || 
|-
! 46
| September 19, 2002 || WtS: Wild Goose (기러기) || Kang Byung-kyu, Lee Soo-young, Seo Ji-young (S#arp) || rowspan=10|Happy "Nip and Tuck" Battle || Iconiq (Sugar), Lee Min (As One) || 
|-
! 47
| September 26, 2002 || WtS: Evergreen (푸르다) || , Jung Joon, Lee Won-jong || Iconiq (Sugar), Crystal (As One) ||
The guests at left promoted for Birth of a Man
|-
! 48
| October 3, 2002 || WtS: Waiting for You to Come (님이 오시는지) || Yoon Jung-soo, Lee Eui-jeong, Kim Jung-hwa || Iconiq (Sugar), Jerome || 
|-
! 49
| October 10, 2002 || WtS: Echo (메아리) || Im Ha-ryong, Shim Hyung-rae,  || Iconiq (Sugar), Annie || 
|-
! 50
| October 17, 2002 || WtS: Bells (종소리) || Jung Woong-in, Lee Ji-hye (S#arp), Iconiq (Sugar) || Annie, Michael || 
|-
! 51
| October 24, 2002 || WtS: Sunshine Day (햇볕은 쨍쨍) || Kim Jo-han, Jang Na-ra, Rain || Nip and Tuck Best 3 || 
|-
! 52
| October 31, 2002 || WtS: Sad Trees (비목) || Lee Beom-soo, Kim Sun-a, Park Myeong-su || Kim Min-hai, Travis ||
Two first guests at left promoted for Wet Dreams
|-
! 53
| November 7, 2002 || WtS: Leaf Ship (나뭇잎 배) || Park Sang-myun, Lee Jae-yong || Jyanjyan, Annie ||
The guests at left promoted for 
|-
! 54
| November 14, 2002 || WtS: Callistephus (과꽃) || , Kim Wan-sun,  || rowspan=2|Silryuk, Annie || 
|-
! 55
| November 21, 2002 || WtS: My Day (나의 하루) || Im Hyun-sik, Noh Sa-yeon ||
|-
! 56
| November 28, 2002 || WtS: Thinking of Elder Brother (오빠 생각) || colspan=3|Yoo Jae-suk, Song Eun-i || 
|-
! 57
| December 5, 2002 || WtS: In the Memory of My Hometown  (고향 생각) || Park Jun-gyu, Im Chang-jung, Yoo Chae-yeong || Happy "Nip and Tuck" Battle || Eugene Park, Annie ||
The guests at left promoted for Sex Is Zero
|-
! 58
| December 12, 2002 || WtS: Piggy Bank (저금통) || Yum Jung-ah, Ji Jin-hee, Shin Jung-hwan || Metal Tray Drama || Psy, Iconiq (Sugar) ||
Two first guests at left promoted for H
|-
! 59
| December 19, 2002 || WtS: Look Out the Windows  (창 밖을 보라) || Park Sang-min,  || Happy "Nip and Tuck" Battle''' || Hwang Sung-hwan, Annie || 
|-
! 60
| December 26, 2002 || colspan=4|Scenes you want to see again Best 3 || 
|}

2003

2004

2005

Special Broadcast

Notes
WtS = Way to School
Themes of "Way to School" are the Korean old songs with different genres such as folk, art, children ...

Happy Together Friends (2005–2007)

2005

2006

2007

Happy Together Season 3 (2007–2018)

2007

2008

2009

2010

2011

2012

2013

2014

2015

2016

2017

2018

Notes

Happy Together Season 4 (2018 – 2020)

2018

2019

2020

References
Full guests list on KBS website: Happy Together (all episodes), Happy Together Friend (all episodes), Happy Together Season 3 (episodes 1–374, episodes 366–557), Happy Together Season 4'' (all episodes)
Others:

Lists of reality television series episodes
Lists of variety television series episodes
Lists of South Korean television series episodes